William Stephens (1897–1962) was an American film producer.

In the late 1940s he made a number of films for Robert L. Lippert. He also worked with Kroger Babb.

Select credits
Meet Dr. Christian (1939) – producer
The Courageous Dr. Christian (1940) – producer
Dr. Christian Meets the Women (1940) -producer
Remedy for Riches (1940) – producer
Melody for Three (1941) – producer
They Meet Again (1941) – producer
The Return of Rin Tin Tin (1947) – producer
Jungle Goddess (1948) – producer
Thunder in the Pines (1948) – producer
Highway 13 (1948) – producer
Arson, Inc (1949) – producer
Sky Liner (1949) – producer
Deputy Marshal (1949) – producer
Once a Thief (1950) – associate producer
One Too Many (1950) – associate producer
The Bogus Green (1951) (TV) – production supervisor
Secrets of Beauty (1951) – production supervisor
China Smith (1952) (TV series) – production supervisor
Schlitz Playhouse (1952) (TV series) – production supervisor
The Loretta Young Show (1953) – production manager
Appointment in Hondouras (1953) -production supervisor
Police Call (1954) – production supervisor
Witness to Murder (1954) – production supervisor
The Steel Cage (1954) – production supervisor
Men Behind Bars (1954) – supervising producer
Tumbleweed: Baron of Purgatory (1959) (TV series) – production supervisor

References

External links

American film producers